Wagatani Dam  is a gravity dam located in Ishikawa Prefecture in Japan. The dam is used for flood control and power production. The catchment area of the dam is 86.1 km2. The dam impounds about 60  ha of land when full and can store 10100 thousand cubic meters of water. The construction of the dam was started on 1958 and completed in 1964.

See also
List of dams in Japan

References

Dams in Ishikawa Prefecture